"Straight Up" is a single by American recording artist Paula Abdul from her debut studio album, Forever Your Girl (1988). The song is a mid-tempo dance-pop song with influence from the pop rock and new jack swing genres.  Written and produced entirely by Elliot Wolff, the song was released as the album's third single on November 22, 1988, by Virgin Records.

"Straight Up" became Abdul's first top 40 hit in the United States, before going on to be her first chart-topper on the Billboard Hot 100. Her first two singles had been modest hits that had sparked only mild interest in her album, but "Straight Up" helped the album reach the top 20 on the Billboard 200 chart, before it finally reached number one following a record-setting 64 weeks on the market after spawning three more number-one hits. "Straight Up" brought Abdul widespread public attention, and has remained as her biggest international hit to date, reaching the top 10 in at least 16 countries. The song was also included in her six compilation albums, released between 1998 and 2013.

The song also received positive reviews from music critics, with Daniel J. Levitin's This Is Your Brain on Music praising it as "hold[ing] a certain appeal over many, many listenings." It also earned Abdul several award nominations in the US, most notably including her first Grammy nomination in the category of Best Female Pop Vocal Performance in 1990, and six other nominations for its music video at the 1989 MTV Video Music Awards.

Background
According to Paula Abdul, her mother found this song for her. She explains that her mother knew someone whose boyfriend was an aspiring songwriter, and she got "Straight Up" as an 8-track demo. The demo version was "so bad" that Abdul's mother was "crying laughing" at it, and threw it in the trash. But Abdul heard something she liked in it, and retrieved it. At that time she was a full-time choreographer, and on the side, late at night she was recording music. The record label did not think the song was any good but Abdul offered to record two songs they wanted, which she did not like, if they would let her do "Straight Up". The song was recorded at a cost of $3,000. Later a friend of hers told her that somebody with her same name was being played on a northern California radio station. "Literally, within 10 days I [it] sold a million copies." The song was originally recorded in a bathroom, and in the masters of the recording, someone in the next apartment can be heard yelling "Shut up".

"Straight Up" was the third single released from her debut album Forever Your Girl, after "Knocked Out" and "The Way That You Love Me." While the latter found modest success on the R&B charts, radio station KMEL in San Francisco started playing "Straight Up" from the album. The label switched promotion "The Way That You Love Me" to "Straight Up". The strategy paid off, as "Straight Up" spent three weeks at No. 1 in the U.S. "The Way That You Love Me" was promoted a year later and became Abdul's fourth (of five) Top 5 hits from the album in the U.S.

One of the 12" versions was remixed by LA "Powermixers" Chris Modig and Boris Granich, known for their special Power mixes at Power 106 during the 1980s.

Composition
"Straight Up" is performed in the key of D minor with a shuffling tempo of 96 beats per minute in common time and a chord progression of Dm–B–Gm–Am. Running a total length of four minutes and eleven seconds in its original version, the song finds Abdul's vocals span from A3 to C5 in the song, while the singer questioning her partner if he was genuinely loving her or "just having fun".

Commercial performance
"Straight Up" attained breakthrough success for Abdul in the States. After debuting at number 79 on the US Billboard Hot 100 chart on the week of December 3, 1988, the single quickly rose up the chart. By the week of January 21, 1989, the song reached number 13 on the chart, becoming her first top 40 entry and her first number one on the Billboard Hot 100 chart on the week of February 11, 1989, dethroning Sheriff's "When I'm with You" and remaining on the top spot for three consecutive weeks. The song has since spent a total 25 consecutive chart weeks, thus tying with her later re-released second single as her longest charting performance on the Billboard Hot 100, and was eventually ranked as the fourth biggest hit of 1989 on Billboards year-end chart for that year. The single was certified Platinum by the RIAA with sales of more than one million units, and remained as her best-selling single in the country to date.

The song also attained international success, reaching the top 10 in at least 16 countries. In addition to topping the charts in the United States, the single also reached the top in Norway. It reached number two in Canada, Greece, The Netherlands and Sweden, and number three in Denmark, Switzerland, the United Kingdom and West Germany. It also reached number five in Belgium and Finland, number six in Ireland and New Zealand, and number eight in Austria and Finland. In France, the single fell short of the top 10, reaching number 12. The single fell short of the top 20 in Australia, reaching number 27.

Critical reception
Jerry Smith from Music Week wrote, "Having had a US number one, this catchy dance groove by a successful choreographer gets its UK release wth the seemingly unavoidable fate that it should do comparably well here." Daniel J. Levitin's This Is Your Brain on Music praised "Straight Up" for "hold[ing] a certain appeal over many, many listenings."

Music video
The song became so popular that it ascended up the charts before a music video had even been shot for the song. The black and white video, directed by David Fincher and choreographed by Abdul herself in mid-January 1989, won four 1989 MTV Video Music Awards for Best Female Video, Best Editing, Best Choreography, and the first Best Dance Video. The video features an appearance by her friend, comedian Arsenio Hall, whose popular talk show had premiered a few weeks prior to the video shoot. Djimon Hounsou also appears. Released later that month, the video at the time went into very heavy rotation on MTV, helping further Abdul's popularity.

Track listings and formats
 Australia 12-inch single
 "Straight Up" (Ultimix)
 "Opposites Attract" (1990 mix)
 "Straight Up" (single version)

 French 12-inch vinyl
 "Straight Up" (12-inch remix)
 "Straight Up" (Power mix)
 "Straight Up" (House mix)
 "Straight Up" (Marley Marl mix)

 US 12-inch single
 "Straight Up" (12-inch remix)
 "Straight Up" (Power mix)
 "Straight Up" (House mix)

 Japanese mini-CD single
 "Straight Up"
 "Cold Hearted"

Charts and certifications

Weekly charts

Year-end charts

Certifications

Release history

See also
 List of Billboard Hot 100 number-one singles of the 1980s

References

1988 singles
1988 songs
1989 singles
Billboard Hot 100 number-one singles
Black-and-white music videos
Cashbox number-one singles
MTV Video Music Award for Best Female Video
Music videos directed by David Fincher
Number-one singles in Norway
Paula Abdul songs
Songs written by Elliot Wolff
Torch songs
Virgin Records singles